Qaleh Sarhan (also Romanized as Qal‘eh Sarhān; also known as Sarḩān) is a village in Rudhaleh Rural District, Rig District, Ganaveh County, Bushehr Province, Iran. At the 2006 census, its population was 66, in 15 families.

References 

Populated places in Ganaveh County